The following lists events that happened during 1981 in Cape Verde.

Incumbents
President: Aristides Pereira
Prime Minister: Pedro Pires

Events
January: African Party for the Independence of Cape Verde (PAICV) party was established after separating from the African Party for the Independence of Guinea and Cape Verde (PAIGC)

Sports
CS Mindelense won the Cape Verdean Football Championship

Births
March 16: Mikoyam Tavares, footballer

References

 
Years of the 20th century in Cape Verde
1980s in Cape Verde
Cape Verde
Cape Verde